Luc Millecamps (born 10 September 1951) is a Belgian retired footballer who played as a defender. During his career he played for K.S.V. Waregem. He earned 35 caps for the Belgium national team, and participated in UEFA Euro 1980 and the 1982 FIFA World Cup.

He is the brother of fellow ex-footballer Marc Millecamps.

Honours 
KSV Waregem
 Belgian Cup: 1973–74; runner-up 1981–82
 Belgian Super Cup: 1982
UEFA Cup: 1985–86 (semi-finals)
Tournoi de Paris: 1985

Belgium
 UEFA European Championship: runner-up 1980
 Belgian Sports Merit Award: 1980

References

1951 births
Living people
People from Waregem
Belgian footballers
Association football defenders
Belgium international footballers
UEFA Euro 1980 players
1982 FIFA World Cup players
Belgian Pro League players
K.S.V. Waregem players
Footballers from West Flanders